Mampe East Grama Niladhari Division is a  Grama Niladhari Division of the  Kesbewa Divisional Secretariat  of Colombo District  of Western Province, Sri Lanka .  It has Grama Niladhari Division Code 574D.

Mampe East is a surrounded by the  Mavittara South, Kesbewa North, Mampe West, Vishwakalawa, Mampe North and Mavittara North  Grama Niladhari Divisions.

Demographics

Ethnicity 

The Mampe East Grama Niladhari Division has  a Sinhalese majority (98.8%) . In comparison, the Kesbewa Divisional Secretariat (which contains the Mampe East Grama Niladhari Division) has  a Sinhalese majority (97.3%)

Religion 

The Mampe East Grama Niladhari Division has  a Buddhist majority (94.6%) . In comparison, the Kesbewa Divisional Secretariat (which contains the Mampe East Grama Niladhari Division) has  a Buddhist majority (93.0%)

References 

Grama Niladhari Divisions of Kesbewa Divisional Secretariat